Baraga Correctional Facility (AMF) is a Michigan prison, located in Baraga, for adult male prisoners. While it includes a Level I security facility, it is primarily a maximum security prison.

Facility
The prison was opened in 1993 and has eight housing units currently used for Michigan Department of Corrections male prisoners 18 years of age and older. One of the housing units has 280 beds for Level I (lower level security) prisoners. The other seven housing units are for Level V (maximum security) prisoners. Four of the Level V housing units are used by the general prison population, and two are used for segregating inmates from the general prison population. Onsite facilities provide for foodservice, health care, facility maintenance, storage, and prison administration.

Security
The facility is surrounded by double fences with razor-ribbon wire. Electronic detection systems and patrol vehicles are also utilized to maintain perimeter security.

Services
The facility offers education programs, substance-abuse treatment, psychotherapy, counseling, and religious services. Onsite medical and dental care is supplemented by local community providers, the Brooks Medical Center at Marquette Branch Prison and the Duane L. Waters Hospital in Jackson, Michigan.

The prison participates in the Leader Dogs for the Blind's prison puppy raising program, which allows inmates to help raise puppies who are then trained to be guide dogs.

See also

 List of Michigan state prisons

References

External links
 
 Michigan Department of Corrections

Prisons in Michigan
Buildings and structures in Baraga County, Michigan
1993 establishments in Michigan